Scutuloidea kutu is a species of marine isopods in the family Sphaeromatidae, first described by Stephenson and Riley in 1996. No subspecies are listed in the Catalog of Life. The name "kutu" (Māori for "lice") was chosen as a metaphor, as the species lives on seaweed (i.e. the hair of hinemoana, a personification of the ocean).

Description and ecology

Males are approximately 5–7 mm in length, while females are approximately 4–5 mm. Females are often carried on the backs of the males of the species. Scutuloidea kutu can be visually distinguished from Scutuloidea maculata, a similar species in appearance which is also found in New Zealand waters, by colour, having a more spender body and eyes, as well as a pleotelson with no apical notch.

Distribution and habitat

Scutuloidea kutu is found in the northern waters of New Zealand, where it lives in seaweeds, sponges and bryozoa in exposed reef formations, especially around red seaweeds such as Plocamium costatum and Osmundaria colensoi. Specimens have been found in the Bay of Islands, Piha and Piwhane / Spirits Bay.

References

Crustaceans described in 1996
Sphaeromatidae
Marine crustaceans of New Zealand
Endemic fauna of New Zealand
Endemic crustaceans of New Zealand